George Hinde may refer to:

 George Jennings Hinde (1839–1918), British paleontologist
 George Hinde (Owenite), a chairman of the Owenite community in Spa Fields